Dzhihat Kyamil (born 4 August 1989) is a Bulgarian footballer of Turkish descent who plays as a midfielder for Pavlikeni.

Career
Dzihat made his competitive debut for CSKA Sofia in the last match of 2008-09 season against Lokomotiv Mezdra.

Awards
 Bulgarian Supercup - 1 time - 2008 (with CSKA Sofia)

References

External links
 Profile at sportal.bg

1989 births
Living people
Bulgarian people of Turkish descent
Bulgarian footballers
First Professional Football League (Bulgaria) players
PFC CSKA Sofia players
FC Etar 1924 Veliko Tarnovo players
PFC Spartak Varna players
FC Haskovo players
SFC Etar Veliko Tarnovo players
FC Arda Kardzhali players
FC Lokomotiv 1929 Sofia players
Association football midfielders